Funda İpek Karapınar (born 20 March 1984) is a Turkish actress and violist.

Karapınar studied at violin department of Mimar Sinan Fine Arts University Conservatory. She made her television debut with a role in the hit period series Hatırla Sevgili. After appearing in a recurring role in hit crime series Kurtlar Vadisi Pusu. She had her breakthrough with re-written Blair/Arzu role in the teen drama Küçük Sırlar which Turkish of Gossip girl. Between 2015 and 2018, she had a leading role in Kırgın Çiçekler TV series.She played in period series "Ustura Kemal", "Destan", "Köprü".

Filmography

Television

References

External links 

1984 births
Living people
Turkish television actresses
Mimar Sinan Fine Arts University alumni
Actresses from Istanbul
21st-century Turkish actresses